The Green Mile may refer to:

 The Green Mile (novel), a 1996 serial novel by Stephen King
 The Green Mile (film), a 1999 film based on the Stephen King novel, starring Tom Hanks and Michael Clarke Duncan

See also
 Miles Green
 green mileage, see Miles per gallon gasoline equivalent